Rotte, also known as the round lyre or Germanic lyre, is a type of lyre that was widely used in north-western Europe from pre-Christian to medieval times. It a descendent of the ancient lyre which originated in western Asia, was adopted in Ancient Egypt, and then adopted and adapted by the Ancient Greeks.

References

Early musical instruments
Lyres